Buli Airport  is an airport in Buli, Pekaulang, Maba, East Halmahera Regency, North Maluku, Indonesia.

Airlines and destinations 

The following airline are currently serving Buli airport.

References 

Airports in North Maluku